The discography of Australian singer-songwriter and musician Missy Higgins consists of five studio albums, two extended plays, thirty two singles  (including four as a featured artist) and one download-only live album. In 2001, Higgins won the national Unearthed radio competition for unsigned artists with her song "All for Believing" and shortly after signed a recording contract with Eleven. The following year she signed an international contract with Warner Bros. She released a self-titled EP in November 2003. Her debut album, The Sound of White, was released 6 September 2004. It reached No. 1 on the Australian albums chart and was certified nine times platinum by the Australian Recording Industry Association (ARIA). It contained the singles "Scar", "Ten Days", "The Special Two" and "The Sound of White".

Higgins' second album, On a Clear Night, was released 28 April 2007. Like its predecessor, it reached No. 1 on the Australian albums chart and was certified three times platinum by ARIA. On a Clear Night produced three singles: "Steer", "Where I Stood" and "Peachy".

Albums

Studio albums

Mini albums

Live albums

Compilations

Video albums

Extended plays

Singles

As lead artist

Notes

As featured artist

Other appearances

References

External links

Discographies of Australian artists
Pop music discographies